Timothy John van de Molen (born 1985) is a New Zealand politician and Member of Parliament in the House of Representatives for the National Party.

Personal life
Born in 1985 to two primary school teachers and one of five children, van de Molen grew up mainly in Matamata and lives in Tamahere, Waikato. As of 2017, he had never lived outside of the Waikato region apart from an OE. He has a degree in social sciences with a psychology major.

He has worked as a farmer; in 2013, he won the NZ Young Farmer of the Year Award and was runner up in 2011, and he bought a farm when he was 29 years old. He has also worked as a rural manager for Rabobank, as well as in the army, in tourism, and for the ambulance service St John New Zealand.

Van de Molen is married to his wife Hilary and has a daughter and a son.

In February 2022 van de Molen fell from a platform, resulting in two broken arms and a fractured spine and rib.

Political career

He had not previously stood for parliament or another office. Van de Molen was selected by National to replace Lindsay Tisch as their candidate as Tisch had decided not to seek re-election. Van de Molen was expected to win – the Waikato electorate has been held by the National Party since 1938 – and he did so, winning with 61% of the electorate vote. He said that his focuses in his first term would be improving broadband in rural areas and advancing a Waikato medical school to train rural GPs.

In 2018, van de Molen took on the role of the National Party's Third Whip, subordinate to the party's Senior Whip. He also served on the Primary Production and the Transport and Infrastructure select committees during this term.

In the 2020 general election, van de Molen again stood for Waikato. In his campaign, he said that agriculture and transport remained his focus, including advocating for the Cambridge to Piarere expressway extension and seeking reduced expectation for farming to make drastic changes around the environment without support. He retained the seat with 51% of the electorate vote.

Voting record 
Van de Molen voted in favour of the final reading for the End of Life Choice Bill in 2019, unlike most of his National MP colleagues. He voted in favour of the first and second readings of the Abortion Legislation Bill of 2019, but against its third, final reading.

References

Living people
New Zealand National Party MPs
Members of the New Zealand House of Representatives
Candidates in the 2017 New Zealand general election
New Zealand MPs for North Island electorates
1985 births